Carole Anne Gildenhuys (born 19 November 1943) is a South African former cricketer who played as a wicket-keeper. She appeared in three Test matches for South Africa in 1972, all against New Zealand, scoring 184 runs with a high score of 94. She played domestic cricket for Southern Transvaal.

References

External links
 
 

1943 births
Living people
Cricketers from Port Elizabeth
South African women cricketers
South Africa women Test cricketers
Central Gauteng women cricketers
Wicket-keepers